Xavier Ortiz Ramírez (June 29, 1962 or 1972 – September 7, 2020) was a Mexican actor, singer, model, producer, TV host, dentist/surgeon and entrepreneur and owner of bar-restaurant La Santa Bar in Guadalajara, Mexico. A former member of the 8-piece musical group Garibaldi, on April 17, 1999, he married another former member of the group Garibaldi, Patricia Manterola. Their relationship lasted 15 years, including 10 years as a couple and 5 years as husband and wife.

With Garibaldi he filmed Dónde quedó la bolita and after he left the band made three telenovelas with Televisa. He was part of the cast of the film Journey from the Fall and the Mexican production of P.S. Your Cat Is Dead.

Films

  Peligrosa tentacion (2008) as Carlo
 Journey from the Fall (2005) as Bully
 Las pasiones de sor juana (2004) as Antonio Mancera
 Dónde quedó la bolita (1993) (as a member of Garibaldi)

Telenovelas

 La rosa de guadalupe 'papito querido' (2010)
 Un Gancho al Corazon (2009) as Lalo
Tormenta en el Paraiso (2007) as Emilio
 Duelo de pasiones (2006) as Rodrigo Ochoa
Te amaré en silencio (2003) as Federico
 Por tu amor (1999) as Pablo
 Camila (1998) as Rodrigo Sandoval
 Sentimientos Ajenos (1996) as Humberto

Programs 

 "La Riera" .... Francesc (1 episode, 2010) 
    - Episode #1.83 (2010) TV episode (as Xavi Ortiz) .... Francesc

 "Adictos" (1 episode, 2009) 
    - Drogas (2009) TV episode
 "Un gancho al corazón" .... Lalo Mora (1 episode, 2008) 
    - Una oportunidad (2008) TV episode .... Lalo Mora
 "In Plain Sight" .... Male Singer (1 episode, 2008) 
    - Don of the Dead (2008) TV episode .... Male Singer
 Che: Part One (2008) .... Felipe Pazos 
... aka "The Argentine" - International (English title) (alternative title), USA (working title)
 Peligrosa tentación (2008) (V)
 "Vecinos" .... Alejandro / ... (2 episodes, 2006–2008) 
    - Enchúlame mi auto (2008) TV episode .... Alejandro
    - Buscando al portero (2006) TV episode .... Jimmy
 "Tormenta en el paraíso" .... Emilio (1 episode, 2007) 
    - Episode #1.1 (2007) TV episode .... Emilio
 "Duelo de pasiones" .... Rodrigo (1 episode, 2006) 
    - Duelo de pasiones (2006) TV episode .... Rodrigo
 Journey from the Fall (2006) .... Bully
 "La fea más bella" .... Bugambilia (1 episode, 2006) 
... aka "The Prettiest Ugly Girl" - International (English title)
    - La fea más bella (2006) TV episode .... Bugambilia
 Más que hermanos (2005) (TV) (as Xavi Ortiz) .... Padre hospital
 "Hospital Central" (1 episode, 2004) 
    - Suma de vectores (2004) TV episode
 Las pasiones de sor Juana (2004) .... Antonio Mancera
 "Te amaré en silencio" (2003) TV series .... Federico
 Amb el 10 a l'esquena (2003) (TV) (as Xavi Ortiz) .... Vecino Gradas

 "Por tu amor" .... Pablo (1 episode, 1999) 
    - Por tu amor (1999) TV episode .... Pablo
 "Camila" (1998) TV series (as Xavier Ortiz) .... Rodrigo Sandoval
 "Sentimientos ajenos" (1996) TV series .... Humberto
 Dónde quedó la bolita (1993) (as Garibaldi)

Self :
 "Historias engarzadas" .... Himself (1 episode, 2007) 
    - Adriana Barraza I (2007) TV episode .... Himself
 "Big Brother VIP: México" .... Himself (1 episode, 2005) 
    - Supermiércoles de Dominó (2005) TV episode .... Himself
 "¡Despierta América!" .... Himself (1 episode, 2004)

Theater

 Aventurera (2004-2020) as Bugambilia
Table dance (2009) produced by himself
 Sólo para Mujeres (2005) as himself and was given the name "dios griego" by the fans
 P.D. Tu gato ha muerto ("P.S. Your Cat Is Dead")
programs

Death
Ortiz died on September 7, 2020 in Guadalajara. According to his sister, Olga Ortiz Ramirez, he committed suicide by hanging, depressed by the COVID-19 pandemic situation, a recent separation from his wife, and a number of other reasons.

References

External links
 
 

Mexican male singers
Mexican male film actors
Place of birth missing
Mexican male stage actors
Mexican male telenovela actors
Suicides in Mexico
2020 suicides
Year of birth uncertain
2020 deaths
1962 births
1972 births
Suicides by hanging in Mexico